Zagoué is a town in western Ivory Coast. It is a sub-prefecture of Man Department in Tonkpi Region, Montagnes District.

Zagoué was a commune until March 2012, when it became one of 1126 communes nationwide that were abolished.

In 2014, the population of the sub-prefecture of Zagoué was 5,410.

Villages
The seven villages of the sub-prefecture of Zagoué and their population in 2014 are:
 Déoulé (1 332)
 Gboanlé (133)
 Gboapeuloulé (624)
 Glégouin (295)
 Gouétimba (1 222)
 Singouin (558)
 Zagoué (1 246)

Notes

Sub-prefectures of Tonkpi
Former communes of Ivory Coast